Mameshiba may refer to:
  are any of a number of Japanese animation characters, each a legume with the face of a cartoon dog
  is the ninth single by Japanese singer Maaya Sakamoto